Carmen Klaschka (born 8 January 1987) is a retired German tennis player.

Klaschka won three singles titles and ten doubles titles on the ITF Circuit in her career. On 27 July 2009, she reached her best singles ranking of world No. 167. On 3 August 2009, she peaked at No. 125 in the doubles rankings.

Carmen's sister, Sabine Klaschka, is also a professional tennis player.

ITF finals

Singles (3–5)

Doubles (10–15)

References

External links
 
 

1987 births
Living people
Tennis players from Munich
German female tennis players
21st-century German women